Mastens Corner is an unincorporated community in Kent County, Delaware, United States.

The community was named for William Masten, a pioneer settler. The Vogl House, which is listed on the National Register of Historic Places, is located near Mastens Corner.

References

Unincorporated communities in Kent County, Delaware
Unincorporated communities in Delaware